Charlotte-Mecklenburg Schools (abbreviated CMS) is a local education agency headquartered in Charlotte, North Carolina and is the public school system for Mecklenburg County.  With over 147,000 students enrolled, it is the second-largest school district in North Carolina and the eighteenth-largest in the nation. The system is best known nationally for its role as the respondent in the landmark 1971 Supreme Court decision Swann v. Charlotte-Mecklenburg Schools.

History
In 1974 the school assignment plan was updated to include 4 “other schools” these schools were the predecessors of magnet schools. In March 1992 a school assignment plan was developed that included magnet schools. In 2016 the nine board members all voted to create a magnet school program in which different socioeconomic groups would be integrated.

Governance
The Charlotte-Mecklenburg Board of Education, or school board, consists of 9 members—3 at-large and 6 from districts.  Before 1995, the board had been elected entirely on an at-large basis, but this was changed after it was discovered nearly all of the board members lived in the eastern part of the county. Members serve staggered four-year terms; the at-large members are elected in the year before presidential elections and the district members are elected in the year after presidential elections.  Although school board elections are nonpartisan, the district members are elected from the same districts as the county commissioners.

List of superintendents
The following individuals have served as superintendents of CMS and its preceding agencies.

Superintendent of Charlotte City Schools 
T.J. Mitchell (1882–1886)
Professor John T. Corlew (1886–1888)
Dr. Alexander Graham (1888–1913)
Dr. Harry Harding (1913–1949)
Dr. Elmer Garinger (1949–1960)

Superintendent of Mecklenburg County Schools 
James W. Wilson (1944–1960)

Superintendent of Charlotte-Mecklenburg Schools 
Dr. Elmer Garinger (1960–1962)
Dr. A. Craig Phillips (1962–1967)
Dr. William Self (1967–1973)
Dr. Rolland Jones (1973–1977)
Dr. Jay Robinson (1977–1987)
Dr. Peter Relic (1987–1991)
Dr. John Murphy (1991–1996)
Dr. Eric Smith (1996–2002)
Dr. James L. Pughsley (2002–2005)
Dr. Frances Haithcock (2005–2006)
Dr. Peter Gorman (2006–2011)
Hugh Hattabaugh (2011–2012)
 Dr. Heath Morrison (2012-2014)
Ann Blakeney Clark (2014–2017)
 Dr. Clayton Wilcox (2017-2019)
Mr. Earnest Winston (2019–2022) 
Hugh Hattabaugh (2022-Present)

High schools 
CMS operates 20 high schools. Charlotte-Mecklenburg Schools also operates the 3 largest high schools in the state of North Carolina; Myers Park High School has 3,593, Ardrey Kell High School has 3,437, and South Mecklenburg High School has 3,202 students.

University City and North Charlotte 
Hopewell High School (2001, Titans)
Mallard Creek High School (2007, Mavericks)
North Mecklenburg High School (1951, Vikings)
Julius L. Chambers High School, (1997, Cougars)
William A. Hough High School (2010, Huskies)

Mint Hill, Matthews, and East Charlotte 
David W. Butler High School (1997, Bulldogs)
East Mecklenburg High School (1950, Eagles)
Garinger High School (1908, Wildcats: formerly Charlotte Central High School from 1923 until 1959)
Independence High School (1967, Patriots)
Rocky River High School (2010, Ravens)

Pineville, Ballantyne, Providence, and South Charlotte 
Ardrey Kell High School (2006, Knights)
Myers Park High School (1951, Mustangs)
Olympic High School (1966, Trojans)
South Mecklenburg High School (1959, Sabres)
Palisades High School (2022, Pumas)
Providence High School (1989, Panthers)

West Charlotte 
Phillip O. Berry Academy of Technology (2002, Cardinals)
Harding University High School (1935, Rams)
West Charlotte High School (1938, Lions)
West Mecklenburg High School (1951, Hawks)

Middle schools 

Albemarle Road Middle School (Hornets)
 Alexander Graham Middle School (Bulldogs)
 Bailey Middle School (Broncos)
 Carmel Middle School (Cougars)
 Cochrane Collegiate Academy (Colts)
 Community House Middle School (Cavaliers)
 Coulwood Middle School (Catamounts)
 Crestdale Middle School (Wildcats)
 Eastway Middle School (Jaguars)
 Francis Bradley Middle School (Mavericks)
 J. M. Alexander Middle School (Blue Devils)
 James Martin Middle School (Cougars)
 Jay M. Robinson Middle School (Chargers)
 Kennedy Middle School (Wapitis)
 Marie G. Davis Middle School (Jaguars)
 Martin Luther King Jr. Middle School (Lions)
 McClintock Middle School (Mighty Scots)
 Mint Hill Middle School (Miners)
 Northeast Middle School (Eagles)
 Northridge Middle School (Hawks)
 Piedmont Open IB Middle School (Pirates)
 Quail Hollow Middle School (Falcons)
 Randolph Middle School (Raiders)
 Ranson Middle School (Raiders)
 Ridge Road Middle School (Ravens)
 Sedgefield Middle School (Spartans)
 South Charlotte Middle School (Shockers)
 Southwest Middle School (Patriots)
 Whitewater Middle School (Gators)
 Wilson Stem Academy (Wolverines)

Elementary schools 
The International Baccalaureate (IB) Program is offered at many schools.

 Albemarle Road Elementary School
 Allenbrook Elementary School
 Amay James Pre-K School
 Ashley Park Elementary School
 Bain Elementary School
 Ballantyne Elementary School
 Berryhill Elementary School
 Barnette Elementary School
 Beverly Woods Elementary School
 Billingsville Elementary School
 Blythe Elementary School
 Briarwood Elementary School
 Bruns Avenue Elementary School
 Chantilly Montessori Elementary School
 Charles H. Parker Academic Center
 Clear Creek Elementary School
 Collinswood Language Academy
 Cornelius Elementary School
 Cotswold Elementary School
 Croft Community School
 Crown Point Elementary School
 David Cox Road Elementary School
 Davidson Elementary School
 Devonshire Elementary School
 Dilworth Elementary School
 Double Oaks Pre-K School
 Druid Hills Elementary School
 Eastover Elementary School
 Elizabeth Traditional Elementary School
 Elon Park Elementary School
 Endhaven Elementary School
 Greenway Park Elementary School
 Hawk Ridge Elementary School
 Hickory Grove Elementary School
 First Ward Elementary School
 Highland Mill Montessori Elementary School
 Highland Creek Elementary School
 Hidden Valley Elementary School
 Highland Renaissance Elementary School
 Hornets Nest Elementary School
 Huntersville Elementary School
 Huntingtowne Farms Elementary School
 Idlewild Elementary School
 Irwin Academic Center
 J. H. Gunn Elementary School
 J. V. Washam Elementary School
 Joseph W. Grier Elementary School
 Lake Wylie Elementary School
 Lansdowne Elementary School
 Lebanon Road Elementary School
 Lincoln Heights Elementary School
 Long Creek Elementary School
 Mallard Creek Elementary School
 Matthews Elementary School
 McAlpine Elementary School
 McKee Road Elementary School
 Merry Oaks Elementary School
 Montclaire Elementary School
 Morehead Elementary School
 Mountain Island Lake Academy
 Myers Park Traditional Elementary School
 Nations Ford Elementary School
 Nathaniel Alexander Elementary School
 Newell Elementary School
 Oakdale Elementary School
 Oakhurst Elementary School
 Oaklawn Language Academy
 Olde Providence Elementary School
 Park Road Montessori Elementary School
 Paw Creek Elementary School
 Pawtuckett Elementary School
 Pineville Elementary School
 Pinewood Elementary School
 Piney Grove Elementary School
 Polo Ridge Elementary School
 Plaza Road Pre-K School
 Providence Spring Elementary School
 Rama Road Elementary School
 Reedy Creek Elementary School
 Reid Park Elementary School
 River Gate Elementary School
 River Oaks Academy
 Sedgefield Elementary School
 Selwyn Elementary School
 Shamrock Gardens Elementary School
 Sharon Elementary School
 Smithfield Elementary School
 South Academy of International Languages
 Starmount Pre-K School
 Statesville Road Elementary School
 Steele Creek Elementary School
 Sterling Elementary School
 Stoney Creek Elementary School
 Thomasboro Elementary School
 Torrence Creek Elementary School
 Tryon Hills Pre-K School
 Tuckaseegee Elementary School
 University Meadows Elementary School
 University Park Elementary School
 Villa Heights Elementary School
 Walter G. Byers Elementary School
 Westerly Hills Elementary School
 Winding Springs Elementary School
 Windsor Park Elementary School
 Winget Park Elementary School
 Winterfield Elementary School

Achievements 

Several CMS high schools have been recognized by Newsweek as being among the 100 best high schools in the United States, a statistic based on the number of advanced classes that are offered to students.

During the 2006–2007 school year CMS students received $43.5 million in academic merit-based financial aid from universities and other organizations, and $12.1 million in athletic scholarships.

Criticisms

Judge Howard Manning
In May 2005, Wake County Superior Court Judge Howard Manning Jr. issued a ruling in which he accused CMS of "academic genocide" against at-risk, low-income students in low-scoring high schools. Since the debut of its new student assignment plan in 2002, and the end of its court-ordered busing program, CMS has seen an increase in concentrations of poverty, with schools that have student-poverty rates of at least 75 percent at twice the number they were before. In the same year, Judge Manning also threatened to close 4 of the lowest performing high schools, Garinger, Waddell, West Charlotte and West Mecklenburg. Many teachers and parents felt he had gone too far, and, in the end, this never occurred as the 4 high schools presented turnaround plans and their principals were deemed capable of carrying them out. The high schools are now included in a special Achievement Zone.

2005 and 2007 bond packages
56% of voters rejected a $427 million bond package in 2005 to improve facilities and build new schools for the first time in a decade. Dissenters cited spats between members of the school board and other well-publicized events that year hurting their confidence in the district's ability to spend money effectively. A$516 million bond package was backed by 68% of voters in November 2007.

Decentralization
Calls for decentralization mounted in 2005 as dissatisfaction with CMS grew, with some wanting CMS broken up into smaller school systems. One notable incarnation of this movement was called DUMP (Don't Underestimate Mecklenburg Parents) CMS. This effort abated when the Board of Education requested and newly hired Superintendent Peter Gorman outlined a plan for decentralization, with the stated goal of putting resources and administration closer to parents and other members of the public. Regional offices known as "learning communities", each with an area superintendent, were implemented in the 2007–2008 school year.

Handling of sexual assault allegations
Multiple students and their families have alleged reporting sexual assaults has led to dismissive responses and retributive action from CMS administrators. The allegations span from 2014 through 2021.

A widely covered allegation is in regards to a female student who was sexually harassed from seventh grade in 2014 onward, escalating to sexual assault in her freshman year in 2016. All of the alleged harassment and the assault occurred on various CMS campuses. Mark Bosco, the principal at Myers Park High School where the alleged sexual assault took place, was suspended with pay and later reassigned to an administrative position within the school district; this move was widely reported and criticized by students and their families. As of June 2022, a lawsuit is currently in progress regarding CMS' handling of sexual assault allegations.

References

External links

History of CMS

Education in Mecklenburg County, North Carolina
Education in Charlotte, North Carolina
School districts in North Carolina
School districts established in 1960